Sergei Vasilievich Kuchmasov (born 3 August 1981 in Penza, Russian SFSR) is a Belarusian springboard diver. Kuchmasov made his official debut at the 2004 Summer Olympics in Athens, representing Belarus. He placed twenty-fifth in the men's springboard event, by forty-two hundredths of a point ahead of Ukraine's Yuriy Shlyakhov, with a total score of 377.61.

At the 2008 Summer Olympics in Beijing, Kuchmasov repeated his overall position in the preliminary rounds of the 3 m individual springboard event. He scored a total of 399.60 points in six successive attempts, just one point closely behind Brazil's César Castro.

References

External links
NBC 2008 Olympics profile

Belarusian male divers
Russian male divers
Olympic divers of Belarus
Divers at the 2004 Summer Olympics
Divers at the 2008 Summer Olympics
Sportspeople from Penza
Sportspeople from Minsk
1981 births
Living people